Statistics of Bahraini Premier League in the 1976–77 season.

Overview
Al-Ahli won the championship.

References
RSSSF

Bahraini Premier League seasons
Bah
football